Pete Francis Heimbold (August 1, 1975) is a founding member of the alternative roots band Dispatch. Since departing the group in 2019, he has established himself as a producer, songwriter, multi-instrumentalist, mental health advocate, and educator. His latest solo release is PTRN SKY! (out May 12, 2023 on Noble Steed Music).

Biography 
Francis grew up in Riverside, Connecticut, the youngest of four children, and drew early influence from the likes of Van Morrison, Cat Stevens, Tom Waits, Joni Mitchell, and Miles Davis.
As a student at Middlebury College in Vermont, Francis formed a band with guitarist/bassist/songwriter Chad Urmston and drummer Brad Corrigan. Originally called One Fell Swoop, the group soon changed its name to Dispatch and would go on to sell more than 700,000 albums, sell out New York's Madison Square Garden five times and Boston's TD Garden three times, and become the first group to sell out New Jersey's Red Bull Arena. On July 31st, 2004, the band drew more than 100,000 people to Boston's Hatch Memorial Shell. 

Though few knew it at the time, Francis was fighting an increasingly difficult battle with depression throughout his years of touring and recording with Dispatch, and after taking multiple leaves of absence, he eventually made the decision to step away from the band entirely in order to focus more fully on his health and wellbeing in 2019. 

Francis recorded a several solo albums on the side during his years with Dispatch, and in 2023, he announced his first collection since departing the group, PTRN SKY! Leaning heavily on synthesizers and drum loops and embracing the marriage of organic and electronic elements, the collection marks a sonic leap for Francis, who reckons with the depression and anxiety that have dogged him for most of his adult life by transforming doubt and pain into growth and transcendence at every turn.

In addition to his work as a musician, Francis has also taught songwriting at Middlebury College and collaborated with his wife, the visual artist Katie Heimbold, to launch the Dragoncrest Collective, a community organization that seeks to bring artists and art-lovers together through a series of live, interactive shows and events.

He currently lives in Connecticut.

Discography 
For discography of Dispatch, see Dispatch Discography
 2001: So They Say – Scrapper Records
 2003: Untold – Scrapper Records
 2004: Good To Finally Know – Scrapper Records
 2006: Everything Is One- Scrapper Records
 2008: Iron Sea and the Cavalry- Scrapper Records
 2009: Wake the Mountain w/Barefoot Truth- Scrapper Records
 2010: The Movie We Are In- Scrapper Records
 2013: Immodal Implozego – ii Records
 2015: Dragon Crest Collective Volume 1

 2021: Humble Down
 2021: Sun Fuzz

 2023: PTRN SKY!

Equipment 

Instruments
 Nash Presicion Bass
 Modulus Bass
 1979 Fender Telecaster
 1980 Gibson 335 electric guitar
 1930s National Resonator
 1940 Gibson 135 Jazz Box
 Collings D-1 acoustics
Amplifiers
 Noise Iconoclast Amplifier

Effects
 Boss TU2 Chromatic Tuner
 Fulltone Clyde Wah Deluxe
 Fulltone OCD Overdrive
 Boss Analog Delay

References

External links

Official 
 Pete Francis Official Website

Informational 
 

1981 births
Living people
20th-century American singers
21st-century American singers
American male bass guitarists
American male singer-songwriters
American rock guitarists
American rock singers
20th-century American bass guitarists
21st-century American bass guitarists
People from Riverside, Connecticut
20th-century American male singers
21st-century American male singers
Dispatch (band) members
Singer-songwriters from Connecticut